The Patten River is a tributary of the Turgeon River, which flows into the Harricana River in Canada; the latest flows to the southern shore of James Bay. The course of the river pass through mainly North-West of Quebec in Eeyou Istchee Baie-James (municipality), then through North-East of Ontario in Cochrane District, in the city of Cochrane, Ontario. The "Patten River" originated in Quebec in Western part of Eeyou Istchee Baie-James (municipality).

Geography 

The neighboring hydrographic slopes of the Patten River are:
North side: Burntbush River (Ontario);
East side: Turgeon River (Ontario and Quebec), Boivin River (Quebec);
South side: Chaboillez River (Ontario), La Reine River (Ontario);
West side: Kabika River (Ontario), Kabika River East (Ontario), Case River (Ontario).

This lake straddles the Ontario - Quebec border, west of the headland of the Boivin River.
 stream from the north, flowing  more or less parallel to the interprovincial boundary;
 stream from the northeast, which flows , draining some small lakes;
 stream from the northeast, flowing ;
 creek from the south (Abitibi Hills), which runs  more or less parallel to the interprovincial boundary. It flows into the Patten River  from its mouth. He feeds on Lake Poison. It receives the waters of a stream ( long) from the south (near the border), draining an unnamed lake.

From the mouth (located on the Ontario side) of Lake Bill, the Patten River flows on:
 westward to the east shore of Lake Joe in Ontario, which flows  westward in the northern part of the lake;
 to North-West forming a curve toward North and receiving many surrounding creeks, up to the mouth of South Patten River (coming from South);
 to North-West, up to a creek (coming from South-West);
 to North, more or less in parallel with Ontario-Quebec border, then North-East, up to the mouth of Little Clive River (coming from South).
 to the North, forming a curve toward West, up to the mouth of the river.

Toponymy 
The term "Patten" refers to a family name of English origin.

See also 

South Patten River, a watercouse
Turgeon River, a watercouse
Harricana River, a watercouse
James Bay
Eeyou Istchee Baie-James (municipality)
District of Cochrane (Ontario)
List of rivers of Quebec
List of rivers of Ontario

References

External links 

Rivers of Nord-du-Québec
Patten